Eiglera is a genus of crustose lichens belonging to the family Eigleraceae. Eiglera species are found in Europe and Northern America.

The genus was circumscribed by lichenologist Josef Hafellner in 1984, with Eiglera flavida assigned as the type species; this lichen had previously been classified in either Aspicilia or Lecanora. The genus name Eiglera honours German botanist Gerhard Eigler.

Species
Eiglera flavida 
Eiglera homalomorpha

References

Acarosporales
Lecanoromycetes genera
Lichen genera
Taxa named by Josef Hafellner
Taxa described in 1984